Frederick John Philip Gibson, (born 19 July 1993) known professionally as Fred Again (stylised as Fred again..) or simply Fred (stylised as FRED), is a British record producer, singer, songwriter, multi-instrumentalist, and DJ.

Early life and education
Frederick John Philip Gibson was born in Balham, South London on 19 July 1993.

He is the son of King's Counsel barrister Charles Anthony Warneford Gibson and Mary Ann Frances Morgan, members of the British peerage. He is the great-grandson of aristocrat and financier Shane O'Neill, 3rd Baron O'Neill and British socialite Ann Fleming (who later went on to marry James Bond creator Ian Fleming).

Gibson attended the private boarding school Marlborough College in Marlborough, Wiltshire, England between 2006 and 2011.

Career 
Aged 16, Gibson joined an a cappella group at Brian Eno's studio in London, who was his family's neighbour at the time. In 2014, he collaborated as co-producer and songwriter with Eno and Karl Hyde on their two project albums Someday World and High Life (songwriter only). Also in 2014, Gibson participated in that year's Red Bull Music Academy, held in Tokyo, Japan.

In 2018, George Ezra's song "Shotgun", co-written by Fred, reached Number 1 in the charts, remaining in the top 3 for 12 consecutive weeks. Later, in the same year, Gibson was also credited with co-writing "Solo" by Clean Bandit featuring Demi Lovato, and gained further success with Rita Ora's song "Let You Love Me". Gibson is credited with writing and/or producing 12 of 15 of Ed Sheeran's 2019 No.6 Collaborations Project, with credited songs featuring for a total of 14 weeks at Number 1 in the charts.

Gibson won Producer of the Year at the Brit Awards 2020. He is the youngest producer to ever win the title. The win was voted for by a group of industry-wide A&R executives and was then selected by the Music Producers' Guild.

Actual Life and critical acclaim
In 2019, Gibson began a project titled Actual Life, in which he collects samples from various sources – such as voice memos, clips from social media, and music by other artists – and incorporates them into original tracks. Gibson released the first of these albums, titled Actual Life (April 14 - December 17 2020), in April 2021, which he described as a "collaborative diary" reflecting his life experiences during the COVID-19 pandemic. He released a follow-up, Actual Life 2 (February 2 - October 15 2021), later that year in November.

In July 2022, Gibson performed a set for Boiler Room in London, which received critical acclaim and resulted in a surge in his popularity. The same week, he released the single "Turn On the Lights again.." with Swedish House Mafia, which samples Future's 2012 single "Turn On the Lights".

Gibson's third solo studio album, Actual Life 3 (January 1 - September 9 2022), was released on 28 October 2022. It was preceded by five singles: "Danielle (Smile on My Face)", "Bleu (Better with Time)", "Kammy (Like I Do)", "Delilah (Pull Me Out of This)" and "Clara (The Night Is Dark)".

Gibson's debut tour, which ran between October 2022 and February 2023 was fully sold out across all 15 dates, which stopped in Europe, America, New Zealand and Australia. Prior to this tour, he'd done sporadic pop up shows and festivals starting in late 2021, such as the above-mentioned Boiler Room and going B2B with Swedish House Mafia.

In a TikTok stitch on January 31, 2023 with user “@maddysb99”, Fred confirmed that his name “Fred Again..” came from a line in the live action movie “Scooby-Doo” where Fred, in the voice of Daphne says: “I’m Fred Again..”.

On January 4, 2023, Fred and Skrillex released their collaboration "Rumble" featuring Flowdan. Following this, Fred, Skrillex, and Four Tet played three consecutive sold out shows, all announced the day of. These took place on January 5th, 6th, and 7th across different London venues.

On February 18, 2023, Gibson played a sold-out show alongside Skrillex and Four Tet at New York City's Madison Square Garden. Having announced the performance in the same week as the show, the trio played a warmup set to a large crowd in Times Square the day before.

Discography

Albums

Solo

Collaborative

Extended plays

Singles

Other charted songs

Additional credits
Fred has a lengthy discography, with regular releases since 2014. The discography tables below chronicle some of them.

2014–2016

2017–2019

2020–present

Awards and nominations

Notes

References 

Living people
English electronic musicians
English male singers
English songwriters
English multi-instrumentalists
English record producers
Remixers
DJs from London
1993 births
British male songwriters